The finals and the qualifying heats of the men's 200 metre backstroke event at the 1998 World Aquatics Championships were held on Sunday 1998-01-18 in Perth, Western Australia.

A Final

B Final

Qualifying heats

Remarks

See also
1996 Men's Olympic Games 200m Backstroke (Atlanta)
1997 Men's World SC Championships 200m Backstroke (Gothenburg)
1997 Men's European LC Championships 200m Backstroke (Seville)
2000 Men's Olympic Games 200m Backstroke (Sydney)

References

Swimming at the 1998 World Aquatics Championships